Guthrie is an unincorporated community in Marshall Township, Lawrence County, Indiana.

History
Guthrie was platted in 1866 and was named for a prominent family of pioneer settlers.

Geography

References

Unincorporated communities in Lawrence County, Indiana
Unincorporated communities in Indiana